Angelica Park Circle Historic District is a national historic district in Angelica, Allegany County, New York, United States. The  district encompasses 97 buildings, including the octagonal village green, the county fairgrounds, and the Old Allegany County Courthouse. It was listed on the National Register of Historic Places in 1978.

References

Historic districts on the National Register of Historic Places in New York (state)
Gothic Revival architecture in New York (state)
Historic districts in Allegany County, New York
National Register of Historic Places in Allegany County, New York